Aire Lepik is an Estonian footballer.

Club career: Viljandi JK Tulevik.

She has played for Estonia women's national football team.

In 1994 and 1995, she was chosen to Estonian Female Footballer of the Year.

References

Living people
Estonian women's footballers
Year of birth missing (living people)
Women's association footballers not categorized by position